The Power and the Glory is a 1961 American TV film based on the 1940 novel The Power and the Glory by Graham Greene. It was produced by David Susskind for Talent Associates-Paramount. The production was shot for American TV but also distributed theatrically overseas.

Cast
Laurence Olivier as Priest
George C Scott as Police Lieutenant
Roddy McDowall as Mestizo
Martin Gabel as Police Chief
Julie Harris as Maria
Keenan Wynn as Bootlegger
Frank Conroy as Padre Jose
Mildred Dunnock as Spinster
Patty Duke as Coral
Fritz Weaver as Schoolmaster
Cyril Cusack as Mustafa

Production
It was Olivier's second performance for American television following an acclaimed production of The Moon and Sixpence which won him an Emmy.

Playwright Dale Wassterman wrote the script in seven days.

David Susskind originally wanted Richard Burton to co star with Olivier. The project was announced in April 1961 and the cast finalised in May. It was going to be CBS's "major dramatic production" for the year. The budget was a reported $500,000.

A Mexican township worth $125,000 was built for the production, which was shot at NBC studios, in two studios (although broadcast by CBS). It was one of the most elaborate productions shot for TV at the time.

Taping started 30 May 1961 over a four-week period between the end of Olivier's run in Becket and his return to England. The budget eventually blew out to $746,000 and the running time was 132 minutes.

Reception
The New York Times called it "a proverbial milestone and a major disappointment." The Los Angeles Times said it was "less than it could be".

References

External links

1961 television films
1961 films
Television shows based on British novels
Films based on works by Graham Greene